Viny Silfianus Sunaryo (born 3 July 2002) is an Indonesian footballer who plays a midfielder for Asprov DKI Jakarta and the Indonesia women's national team.

Club career
Silfianus has played for Asprov DKI Jakarta in Indonesia.

International career 
Silfianus represented Indonesia at the 2022 AFC Women's Asian Cup.

References

External links

2002 births
Living people
Sportspeople from Jakarta
Indonesian women's footballers
Women's association football midfielders
Indonesia women's international footballers